Bernard Odell Creger (March 21, 1927 – November 30, 1997) was an American professional baseball shortstop who appeared in 15 games in Major League Baseball for the  St. Louis Cardinals. Creger's pro career began when he was 16 years old and lasted for ten seasons (1943–1952), all but one of them spent in the St. Louis organization.

Creger had only 18 plate appearances for the 1947 Cardinals; he collected three hits—one of them a double—and one base on balls. He was credited with one sacrifice hit and one stolen base. He had no runs batted in. In the field, he played 49 innings during the year and started three late season games at shortstop. He made five errors in 29 total chances for a fielding percentage of .828.

External links

1927 births
1997 deaths
Allentown Cardinals players
Baseball players from Virginia
Binghamton Triplets players
Houston Buffaloes players
Johnson City Cardinals players
Major League Baseball shortstops
Omaha Cardinals players
People from Wytheville, Virginia
Rochester Red Wings players
St. Louis Cardinals players